Mariusz Rybicki (born 13 March 1993) is a Polish professional footballer who plays as an attacking midfielder for Motor Lublin.

References

External links 
 
 

Living people
1993 births
Association football midfielders
Polish footballers
Poland youth international footballers
Poland under-21 international footballers
UKS SMS Łódź players
Widzew Łódź players
Korona Kielce players
Miedź Legnica players
MKP Pogoń Siedlce players
Wigry Suwałki players
Odra Opole players
Warta Poznań players
Motor Lublin players
Ekstraklasa players
I liga players
II liga players
Footballers from Łódź